The pleuron (pl. pleura, from Greek side, rib) is a lateral sclerite of  thoracic segment of an insect between the tergum and the sternum. The terms pro-, meso- and metapleuron are used respectively for the pleura of the first, second and third thoracic segments.

References

Insect anatomy
Thorax (human anatomy)